Capital First Ltd. was an Indian non-bank financial institution providing debt financing to small entrepreneurs, MSMEs (Micro, Small and Medium Enterprises) and Indian consumers. Capital First was founded in 2012 by V. Vaidyanathan.

The company was listed on NSE and BSE. The market cap of the company grew from ₹ 7.81 billion (31 March 2012) to ₹60.96 billion (31 March 2018)

In December 2018 NBFC Capital First and private sector lender IDFC Bank has announced the completion of their merger, creating a combined loan asset book of 1.03 lakh crore for the merged entity. The merged entity to be called IDFC First Bank, subject to shareholders’ approval.

Company history 
The company was initially listed on the Indian Stock exchanges in January 2008 as Future Capital Holdings. Between 2008 and 2010, the company launched a number of diverse businesses including financing real estate developers, corporate credit, private equity, asset management, foreign exchange business (through joint venture arrangement), retail broking business (through joint venture arrangement), mall management, wealth management and property services.

In 2010, V Vaidyanathan, then MD and CEO of ICICI Prudential Life, concluded an agreement to acquire 10% of the equity of the company. Financing India's 50 million MSMEs and India’s emerging middle class, with a differentiated model, based on new technologies, became the new founding theme of the company. In line with this theme, the company exited legacy businesses of Forex, wealth, and broking, and reduced wholesale lending sharply. Based on the above, he succeeded in securing equity backing of ₹8.10 billion from Warburg Pincus to buy out the other shareholders, including ₹ 1.00 billion by way of preferential allotment. An open offer was made to the public in line with SEBI guidelines. The board was reconstituted. A new brand, Capital First, was created.

In 2013–14, the company received the Housing Finance Company (HFC) License from National Housing Bank (NHB) for its wholly owned subsidiary Capital First Home Finance Limited. Capital First also launched new products like SME business loans, personal loans, and affordable housing, and scaled up the existing businesses.

Between 2014 and 2017, Capital First raised significant funding through investments from PE players and Qualified Institutional Placements (QIP). Reputed financial institutions across the world like Government Pension Fund Global (Norway), Jupiter Asset Management, Ashburton Limited, DNB Asset management (Norway), Nomura Asset Management, BNP Paribas Asset Management have invested in Capital First during this phase through secondary market and became shareholders of the company.

In line with V. Vaidyanathan's objective and long-term plan of getting a banking license, on January 13, 2018, in a joint press release issued by IDFC Bank and Capital First, they announced a merger. IDFC Bank is to issue 139 shares for every 10 shares of Capital First and Mr. Vaidyanathan will take over as the MD and CEO of the combined bank.

Corporate social responsibility 
Capital First Ltd. has been actively contributing to the society in the form of its CSR activities. The company’s flagship CSR program and involves providing financial assistance to students who on their own merits, have been able to secure admission to selected management programs, but happen to belong to economically weaker section of the society and are therefore, unable to afford the expenses for the programs. Such students are awarded scholarship under the Capital First Scholarship Program.

References 

Indian companies established in 2008
Financial services companies based in Mumbai
Indian companies disestablished in 2019
IDFC First Bank
2008 establishments in Maharashtra
Companies listed on the National Stock Exchange of India
Companies listed on the Bombay Stock Exchange